Our Little Visionary is the debut album by rock trio Dogstar.  It was primarily distributed in Japan.  It was recorded and mixed at A&M Studios in Hollywood, California and mastered at Precision Mastering.

Track listing
 "Forgive" - 1:59 
 "Our Little Visionary" - 3:03
 "No Matter What" - 2:59 (Badfinger)
 "Breathe Tonight" - 3:00
 "Nobody Home" - 3:37
 "History Light" - 6:03
 "Honesty Anyway" - 3:20
 "And I Pray" - 3:46
 "Enchanted" - 3:14
 "Bleeding Soul" - 3:47
 "Goodbye" - 4:19
 "Denial" - 1:51

Personnel
Dogstar
Bret Domrose - lead vocals, guitar
Keanu Reeves - bass guitar, backing vocals
Robert Mailhouse - drums, percussion, backing vocals
Technical
Ed Stasium - producer, mixer, backing vocals on track 3
Tacia Domrose - backing vocals on track 3
Stephen Marcussen - mastering
Paul Hamingson - engineer
John Aguto - engineer

References

1996 debut albums
Dogstar (band) albums
Albums produced by Ed Stasium
Zoo Entertainment (record label) albums